The canton of Jarny is an administrative division of the Meurthe-et-Moselle department, northeastern France. It was created at the French canton reorganisation which came into effect in March 2015. Its seat is in Jarny.

It consists of the following communes:

Allamont
Auboué
Batilly
Boncourt
Brainville
Bruville
Chambley-Bussières
Conflans-en-Jarnisy
Dampvitoux
Doncourt-lès-Conflans
Friauville
Giraumont
Hagéville
Hannonville-Suzémont
Hatrize
Homécourt
Jarny
Jeandelize
Jouaville
Labry
Mars-la-Tour
Moineville
Moutiers
Olley
Puxe
Puxieux
Saint-Ail
Saint-Julien-lès-Gorze
Saint-Marcel
Sponville
Tronville
Valleroy
Ville-sur-Yron
Xonville

References

Cantons of Meurthe-et-Moselle